Le Vertige is a 1926 French film directed by Marcel l'Herbier, who wrote the screenplay based upon the play by Charles Méré.

Cast
Emmy Lynn as Natacha Svirsky
Jaque Catelain as Henri de Cassel
Roger Karl as General Svirsky
Claire Prélia as Madame de Cassel

Production
Robert and Sonia Delaunay and Robert Mallet-Stevens contributed to the set and costume design for the film.

References

External links

1926 films
French black-and-white films
French silent feature films
French films based on plays
1920s French films